Birseck Castle is located in the municipality of Arlesheim in the canton of Basel-Country. Birseck Castle is also called "Untere Burg Birseck" or "Vordere Burg Birseck" and is one of four castles on a slope called Birseck that confines the plain of the Birs river.

The Eremitage building group that includes the castle is listed as a heritage site of national significance.

Burg Reichenstein is the sister castle to Birseck and sits on a higher slope to the north.

References

External links

 Ruine Birseck on burgenseite.ch
 Ruine Birseck on burgen.ch

Arlesheim
Castles in Basel-Landschaft
Cultural property of national significance in Basel-Landschaft
Gothic architecture in Switzerland